Briga can refer to:
 BRIGA, a Galician independentist political organization
 Brig-Glis, a Swiss city in the Brig district of the Canton of Valais
 Briga Alta, an Italian comune in the Province of Cuneo
 Briga Novarese, an Italian community in the Province of Novara
 Briga, Kostel, a small settlement in the Municipality of Kostel in Slovenia
 Briga (Gallo-Roman town), a Gallo-Roman town situated near Eu in the French department of Seine-Maritime in modern-day Normandy
 La Brigue, a French community in the Alpes-Maritimes department and Provence-Alpes-Côte d'Azur region
 Ried-Brig, a Swiss municipality in the Brig district of the Canton of Valais